The Elizabeth Mrazik-Cleaver Canadian Picture Book Award was established in 1985 following the death of Elizabeth Mrazik-Cleaver, one of Canada's pre-eminent book illustrators. In her will, Cleaver left a fund of $10,000 for an award to be given annually in recognition of outstanding artistic talent in a Canadian picture book. The recipient receives a cheque for $1,000, and a certificate.

The Cleaver Award is administered by a committee of three members of the Canadian section of the International Board on Books for Young People IBBY Canada. The recipient is a Canadian illustrator of a picture book published in Canada in English or French during the previous calendar year.

Winners of the Elizabeth Mrazik-Cleaver Award
2021 - Gérard DuBois, À qui appartiennent les nuages?
2020 - Marie-Louise Gay, The Three Brothers
2019 - Rachel Wada,  The Phone Booth in Mr. Hirota's Garden
2018 - Julie Morstad, Bloom
2017 - Julie Kraulis, A Pattern for Pepper
2016 - Isabelle Arsenault, Louis parmi les spectres
2015 - Sydney Smith, Sidewalk Flowers
2014 - Pierre Pratt, Stop, Thief!
2013 - Julie Morstad, How To
2012 - Isabelle Arsenault, Virginia Wolf
2011 - Cybèle Young, A Few Blocks
2010 - Julie Flett, Lii Yiiboo Nayaapiwak lii Swer: L’Alfabet di Michif / Owls See Clearly at Night: A Michif Alphabet
2009 - Oleg Lipchenko, Alice's Adventures in Wonderland
2008 - Christine Delezenne, La Clé
2007 - Stéphane Jorisch, The Owl and The Pussycat
2006 - Kady MacDonald Denton, Snow
2005 - Geneviève Côté, The Lady of Shalott
2004 - Stéphane Poulin, Un chant de Noël
2003 - Pierre Pratt, Where's Pup?
2002 - Janie Jaehyun Park, The Tiger and The Dried Persimmon
2001 - Marie-Louise Gay, Stella, Queen of The Snow
2000 - Michèle Lemieux, Stormy Night
1999 - Kady MacDonald Denton, A Child's Treasury of Nursery Rhymes
1998 - Pascal Mileli, Rainbow Bay
1997 - Harvey Chan, Ghost Train
1996 - Janet Wilson, Selina and The Bear Paw Quilt
1995 - Murray Kimber, Josepha: A Prairie Boy's Story
1994 - Leo Yerxa, Last Leaf, First Snowflake To Fall
1993 – Barbara Reid, Two By Two
1992 – Ron Lightburn, Waiting for the Whales
1991 – Paul Morin, The Orphan Boy
1990 – Ian Wallace, The Name of the Tree
1989 – Eric Beddows, Night Cars
1988 – Stéphane Poulin, Can You Catch Josephine?
1987 – Barbara Reid, Have You Seen Birds?
1986 – Ann Blades, By The Sea: An Alphabet Book

References
Elizabeth Mrazik-Cleaver Canadian Picture Book Award site

Canadian children's literary awards
Picture book awards
Awards established in 1986
1986 establishments in Canada